Final Cut was a techno-industrial band formed in Detroit, Michigan and led by Anthony Srock with a revolving cast of guest musicians.

History 
Srock, then a DJ in Detroit, formed Final Cut (sometimes preceded by The) in the late 1980s as a collaboration with DJ Jeff Mills. They released their debut single "Take Me Away" in 1989 and the album Deep in 2 the Cut later that year. Final Cut was noted for mixing established industrial music with Detroit techno, with a sound comparable to heavy metal but made with machines rather than guitars. Deep in 2 the Cut gained appreciation years later as an influential early entry in the development of industrial music. Mills then left the project, and Srock took a leadership role with various guest musicians and a more guitar-oriented sound.

The project was signed to I.R.S. Records and their second album Consumed was released in 1992. That year, Final Cut toured with an all-live band with Srock on lead vocals. After a period of inactivity, Srock returned with another collection of guest musicians in 1996, releasing the album Atonement. This album added 1970s funk to the project's established industrial sound. A remix EP titled Grind was released in 1998. A new album was started in 2004 but never completed. 

Srock later founded Full Effect Records. The 2009 hit single "Warriors Dance" by The Prodigy featured a sample of the Final Cut song "Take Me Away".

Selected collaborators

 Taime Downe
 Ogre
 Martin Atkins
 Charles Levi
 Chris Connelly
 Louis Svitek
 William Tucker
 Dwayne Goettel
 Jeff Mills
 Greg Lucas

Discography

Albums
Deep in 2 The Cut (1989)
Consumed (1992)
Atonement (1996)
Grind (EP, 1998)

References

Musical groups from Detroit
Electronic music groups from Michigan
American industrial music groups
1980s establishments in Michigan